Aspidimorpha quinquefasciata is a species of beetles belonging to the family Chrysomelidae.

Distribution
This species has its origines in Africa where it is known from Cameroon, Centrafrique, Congo, Chad, Gabon, the Gambia, Ghana, Guinea Bissau, Ivory Coast, Niger, Nigeria, Senegal and Togo but also from several islands as São Tomé and Príncipe, Madagascar and Réunion.

It was introduced to New Caledonia in 2008.

Biology
The larvae feed on leaves of Convolvulaceae, Ipomoea batatas (sweet potatoes).

References

Cassidinae
Beetles described in 1801
Beetles of Africa